Noura al-Ameer al-Jizawi is a Syrian anti-government activist and vice-president of the Syrian opposition.  When she was 26, she was jailed for six months imprisoned in Damascus and Homs, released late in 2012.

Biography
In 2016, she and her husband, Bahr Abdul Razzak, were living in Gaziantep, Turkey.  She received a suspicious email, and Razzak, a security expert, found evidence she had been hacked by the Iranian government.

She was able to study at the University of Toronto for a masters at the Munk School of Global Affairs through a Scholars-at-Risk scholarship.

References

External links
 Thousands of women raped in Syrian war, activists claim

Syrian women activists
University of Toronto alumni
Syrian dissidents
1980s births
Living people
People from Gaziantep